The 52nd Fair One Filmfare Awards ceremony, presented by The Times Group and Fair One, was one of India's most prestigious awards ceremonies, honoring the best Bollywood films of 2006. It took place on 17 February 2007 at the Yash Raj Studios, Mumbai.

Kabhi Alvida Naa Kehna led the ceremony with 23 nominations, followed by Rang De Basanti with 21 nominations, Omkara with 17 nominations and Lage Raho Munnabhai with 12 nominations.

Omkara won 9 awards, including Best Actress (Critics) (for Kareena Kapoor), Best Supporting Actress (for Konkona Sen Sharma) and Best Villain (for Saif Ali Khan), thus becoming the most-awarded film at the ceremony.

Both Hrithik Roshan and Shah Rukh Khan received dual nominations for Best Actor, with Roshan being nominated for Dhoom 2 and Krrish, and Khan being nominated for Don: The Chase Begins Again and Kabhi Alvida Naa Kehna, with Roshan winning the category for Dhoom 2.

Awards & Nominees

Main Awards
The awards were announced on 8 February 2007.

Critics' Awards

Technical Awards

Special awards

Maximum Nominations & Wins

See also

 Filmfare Awards
 List of highest-grossing Bollywood films

Sources
 Watch 52nd Filmfare Awards Online, youtube.com

External links

 The Official Site
 

Filmfare Awards
2007 Indian film awards